The Ala-Too International University , formerly known as the International Atatürk-Alatoo University, is a private university located in Bishkek, Kyrgyzstan that was established in 1996. The university offers graduate, masters, and doctoral programs. It is often ranked as one of Kyrgyzstan's most prestigious universities.

English is the primary medium of instruction at the university. However, some classes are taught in Russian and a few other classes are taught in Turkish.

The Ala-Too International University was affiliated and funded by Muhammed Fethullah Gülen and his group advocating global Islamic education. Following the failed 2016 Turkish coup d'état attempt, which the Turkish government blamed on Gülen, the university changed its name from the International Atatürk-Alatoo University to the Ala-Too International University, appointed a Kyrgyz rector, and generally started to position itself more as a local institution.

History 

The Ala-Too International University was established as the International Atatürk-Alatoo University in 1996 by the Sebat Educational Foundation which promotes and follows the tenets of Islam espoused by Fethullah Gülen.

In the wake of the 2016 Turkish coup d'état attempt, which the Turkish government blames on Gülen, the administration of Turkish president Recep Tayyip Erdoğan demanded that Kyrgyzstan close down institutions affiliated with the Gülen movement. However, the Kyrgyz government refused to comply with Ankara's demands.  In February 2017, the Turkish government announced that diplomas issued by the Ala-Too International University would no longer be valid in Turkey.

Subsequently, the name of the university was changed from the International Atatürk-Alatoo University to the Ala-Too International University. The name of the organization that runs the Ala-Too International University along with 35 other schools and colleges was also changed from the Sebat Educational Foundation to the Sapat Educational Foundation. Sapat means "quality" in Kyrgyz.

Academics 
The Ala-Too International University has the following departments and programs:

Faculty of New Technologies 
  Computer science
  Electronics and nanoelectronics engineering
  Applied mathematics and IT

Faculty of Social Sciences 

  Turkology
  Сhinese language and translation
  Simultaneous translation
  English language and literature
  Pedagogy
  Psychology
  Journalism

Faculty of Economics and Administrative Sciences 
  World economy and international business
  International relations
  Management
  Finance and banking
  Law
  Accounting and audit
  Industrial engineering

Faculty of Medicine 

  General medicine
  Pediatrics

Vocational Education 
  Economy and accounting
  Banking
  Marketing
  Computer systems and complexes
  Software engineering
  Design
  Jurisprudence

Distance Learning Center
  Management
  Finance and Banking & Accounting
  Accounting , Analysis and Audit
  Internatıonal Economy and Business
  Pedagogy

References

External links

Official website 
Official website 

Educational institutions established in 1996
Universities in Kyrgyzstan
1996 establishments in Kyrgyzstan
Things named after Mustafa Kemal Atatürk